Trinidad and Tobago competed at the 2016 Summer Olympics in Rio de Janeiro, from August 5 to 21, 2016. This was the nation's seventeenth appearance at the Summer Olympics, although it previously competed in four other editions as a British colony, and as part of the West Indies Federation.

Trinidad and Tobago Olympic Committee fielded a team of 32 athletes, 21 men and 11 women, to compete in eight different sports at these Games. It was the nation's largest ever delegation sent to the Olympics, eclipsing the record of 30 athletes who attended the London Games four years earlier. For the first time in Olympic history, Trinidad and Tobago registered its athletes in artistic gymnastics, judo and rowing. As usual, athletics had the largest team by sport with 24 competitors, roughly three quarters of the nation's full roster size. 

The Trinidad and Tobago team featured five Olympic medalists from London, including sprinter Lalonde Gordon in the 400 metres, and javelin thrower Keshorn Walcott, who won the nation's first ever gold after nearly four decades. Looking to defend his title in Rio de Janeiro, Walcott was selected to lead the Trinidad and Tobago contingent as the flag bearer in the opening ceremony. Athens 2004 bronze medalist George Bovell joined the elite club of world-ranked swimmers who have participated in five Olympic Games, while shot putter and reigning Pan American Games champion Cleopatra Borel made history for Trinidad and Tobago as the first female athlete to compete in four Olympics. Other notable athletes on the Trinidad and Tobago roster also included Laser sailor Andrew Lewis, London 2012 semifinalist Njisane Phillip in track cycling, Canadian-born gymnast Marisa Dick, and 39-year-old single sculls rower Felice Chow (the oldest competitor of the team).

Trinidad and Tobago left Rio de Janeiro with only a bronze medal won by Walcott, following up on the gold he had earned in London and narrowly sparing from an out-of-medal feat for the first time since 1992. Several athletes on the Trinidad and Tobago team missed the opportunity to join Walcott on the podium, including Borel (seventh, women's shot put), Cedenio (fourth, men's 400 m), and sprinter Michelle-Lee Ahye, the first woman from her country to appear in three finals at a single edition.

Medalists

Athletics (track and field)

Athletes from Trinidad and Tobago have so far achieved qualifying standards in the following athletics events (up to a maximum of 3 athletes in each event):

A total of 24 athletes (15 men and 9 women) were selected to the nation's track and field team for the Games, based on their results achieved at the Olympic Trials and T&T Open Championships. Among them were reigning Olympic champion Keshorn Walcott (men's javelin throw) and bronze medalists Lalonde Gordon, Machel Cedenio, Jarrin Solomon, and Renny Quow.

Track & road events
Men

Women

Field events

Boxing

Trinidad and Tobago entered one boxer to compete in the men's super heavyweight division into the Olympic boxing tournament. Nigel Paul had claimed his Olympic spot with a semifinal victory at the 2016 American Qualification Tournament in Buenos Aires, Argentina.

Cycling

Track
Following the completion of the 2016 UCI Track Cycling World Championships, Trinidad and Tobago entered one rider to compete only in the men's sprint at the Olympics, by virtue of his final individual UCI Olympic rankings in that event.

Sprint

Gymnastics

Artistic
Trinidad and Tobago entered one artistic gymnast for the first time into the Olympic competition. Originally, the spot was earned by Trinidad born gymnast Thema Williams in the Scotland qualifier. She was later replaced due to controversy* and apparent lack of support by officials on the local gymnastics body the TTGF. Marisa Dick a Canadian born of a Trinidadian mother had claimed her (William's) Olympic spot in the women's apparatus and all-around events at the Olympic Test Event in Rio de Janeiro.
Women

Judo

Trinidad and Tobago has qualified one judoka for the men's half-heavyweight category (100 kg) at the Games, signifying the nation's Olympic debut in the sport. Christopher George earned a continental quota spot from the Pan American region, as Trinidad and Tobago's sole judoka in the IJF World Ranking List of May 30, 2016.

Rowing

For the first time in Olympic history, Trinidad and Tobago has qualified one boat in the women's single sculls for the Games at the 2016 Latin American Continental Qualification Regatta in Valparaiso, Chile.

Qualification Legend: FA=Final A (medal); FB=Final B (non-medal); FC=Final C (non-medal); FD=Final D (non-medal); FE=Final E (non-medal); FF=Final F (non-medal); SA/B=Semifinals A/B; SC/D=Semifinals C/D; SE/F=Semifinals E/F; QF=Quarterfinals; R=Repechage

Sailing
 
Trinidad & Tobago has qualified a boat in men's Laser class by virtue of a top finish for North America at the 2015 Pan American Games.

M = Medal race; EL = Eliminated – did not advance into the medal race

Swimming

Swimmers from Trinidad & Tobago have so far achieved qualifying standards in the following events (up to a maximum of 2 swimmers in each event at the Olympic Qualifying Time (OQT), and potentially 1 at the Olympic Selection Time (OST)):

Men

See also
Trinidad and Tobago at the 2015 Pan American Games

References

External links 
 

Nations at the 2016 Summer Olympics
2016
2016 in Trinidad and Tobago sport